Erik John Ustruck (born January 4, 1985 in St. Louis, Missouri) is former soccer player for the Guam national football team. He played for Orlando City in the USL Professional Division before his retirement from club soccer in 2013. Ustruck was Director of Soccer Operations for Orlando City SC of Major League Soccer and General Manager for Orlando Pride of NWSL before departing professional soccer in 2021.

Career

College
Ustruck played four years at Santa Clara University, scoring eight goals during his collegiate career and fighting back from a knee injury during his junior year. Ustruck finished as Freshman of the Year runner-up in the West Coast Conference while earning All-Conference honors following his Freshman and Senior years. He was noted for his versatility and work ethic.

Professional
Ustruck was drafted by the Dynamo in the third round of the 2007 MLS Supplemental Draft – a draft that he watched online with his friends – as the 39th supplemental pick overall.  Though he played as both a forward and a midfielder in college, Ustruck appears likely to be converted to a right back or right-sided midfielder in MLS.

Ustruck made his full professional debut for Dynamo on 10 July 2007, in a US Open Cup third-round game against Charleston Battery.

He was sent on loan to Austin Aztex on June 16, 2009.

After returning from his short loan spell, Ustruck made his MLS debut, coming on as a sub in Houston's 2–1 loss to Seattle Sounders FC on the road in Seattle.

Ustruck was waived by Houston on March 24, 2010, and signed a one-year contract with the FC Tampa Bay on April 5, 2010.

After his contract was up for FC Tampa Bay, Ustruck signed a multi-year contract with USL Pro club Orlando City on March 18, 2011.

International
He played several games with the Under-20 United States national team in 2004, but never made an official FIFA or confederation appearance for the senior team, so he is not cap tied to any National federation. He was also selected into the Guam National team preliminary squad for the AFC Challenge Cup qualifiers in February 2013. He made his debut for the Matao against Laos in November 2013 during the FIFA International friendly between the two nations.

Honours

Orlando City
USL Pro (2): 2011, 2013

References

External links
 

1985 births
Living people
American soccer players
Guamanian footballers
Houston Dynamo FC players
Austin Aztex FC players
Tampa Bay Rowdies players
Orlando City SC (2010–2014) players
Santa Clara Broncos men's soccer players
USL First Division players
Major League Soccer players
USSF Division 2 Professional League players
USL Championship players
United States men's under-20 international soccer players
Guam international footballers
Houston Dynamo FC draft picks
Association football defenders
Association football midfielders
Soccer players from Missouri